Moorilla Estate is a winery located in the suburb of Berriedale, 12 km north of the city centre of Hobart, in Tasmania.

Establishment
It was  established in 1958 by Italian-Australian former textile merchant Claudio Alcorso.

Moorilla Estate is currently owned by David Walsh, and is the site of the Museum of Old and New Art (MONA).

The winery produces a number of cool climate wines, and also produces five beers under the label Moo Brew.

Moo Brew

In November 2004 a micro-brewery was installed at Moorilla Estate, under the guidance of head brewer, Owen Johnston. In June 2005 the first keg was sold and went on tap at T42° on Hobart’s waterfront. In 2010 Moo Brew expanded and opened a second brewery in Bridgewater, Tasmania. All brewing is now carried out at this secondary site. Moo Brew produce five core beers (each featuring exclusive artwork by Australian artist John Kelly):
 a Pilsner;
 a German-style Hefeweizen;
 a Belgian Pale Ale;
 an American Pale Ale; and
 an American Dark Ale.
They also produce a number of seasonal beers, including:
 a Harvest Ale;
 a seasonal Stout; and
 a farmhouse style Saison.

Accommodation
Accommodation was added in 2000 and consisting of four hilltop chalets which feature items from the Museum of Old and New Art. Four further pavilions were opened in 2009.

Performances
The site also plays host to a number of live music and drama performances on a regular basis, and has a function centre.

See also

Australian pub
Beer in Australia
List of breweries in Australia
Tasmanian beer

References

External links
 Moorilla

Australian companies established in 1958
Food and drink companies established in 1958
Wineries in Tasmania
Music venues in Australia
Beer brewing companies based in Tasmania
Hotels in Hobart